is the railway station in Higashi-Kouji-machi, Isahaya City, Nagasaki Prefecture. It is operated by Shimabara Railway and is on the Shimabara Railway Line.

Lines
Shimabara Railway
Shimabara Railway Line

Station layout
The station is on the ground level with two side platforms for two tracks, and has two sidings on the Isahaya Station side.

Adjacent stations

※ Some Express Train stops at Saiwai Station.

Environs
The Station is in the central area of Isahaya City.
Isahaya City Office
Isahaya Post Office
Isahaya High School
Isahaya Legal Affairs Bureau
Isahaya City Library
Isahaya Park

History
June 20, 1911 - Opens for business.
December, 1989 - The existing station building was completed.

References
Nagasaki statistical yearbook (Nagasaki prefectural office statistics section,Japanese)

External links
Shimabara Railway Official Site 

Railway stations in Japan opened in 1911
Railway stations in Nagasaki Prefecture
Stations of Shimabara Railway